The 1973 Irish general election to the 20th Dáil was held on Wednesday, 28 February 1973, following the dissolution of the 19th Dáil on 5 February by President Éamon de Valera on the request of Taoiseach Jack Lynch. The general election took place in 42 Dáil constituencies throughout Ireland for 144 seats in Dáil Éireann, the house of representatives of the Oireachtas.

The 20th Dáil met at Leinster House on 4 March to nominate the Taoiseach for appointment by the president and to approve the appointment of a new government of Ireland. Liam Cosgrave was appointed Taoiseach, forming the 14th Government of Ireland, a coalition government of Fine Gael and the Labour Party.

Campaign

By the time the general election was called in 1973, Fianna Fáil had been in office since March 1957, just under sixteen years. During that time the party had seen three different leaders: Éamon de Valera, Seán Lemass, and since 1966, Jack Lynch. Lynch had hoped to dissolve the Dáil in December 1972; however, events did not permit this, and the election was eventually called for February 1973.

While Fine Gael and the Labour Party had pursued individual opposition policies since 1957, they agreed to a pre-election pact to fight the election together on the issues that united them. The National Coalition, as it was known, offered the electorate the first credible alternative government in many years.

While Fianna Fáil increased its percentage of the vote, it lost seats. A transfer pact between the National Coalition parties in the single transferable vote system enabled a change of government to take place.

In an interview with Brian Farrell on RTÉ, Jack Lynch became the first Taoiseach to concede defeat live on Irish television. Although the full result was not yet known, Lynch was certain that the transfers between candidates would result in Fianna Fáil losing the general election.

Legal challenge
The Fourth Amendment of the Constitution, approved in a referendum in December 1972 and signed into law in January 1973, had reduced the voting age from 21 to 18. However, the electoral register would not be updated until 15 April, five weeks after the election date. A 20-year-old student, represented by Seán MacBride, sought an injunction from the High Court postponing the election to vindicate his right to vote. He lost his case, although he was awarded his costs due to its "public importance".

Result

|}

Voting summary

Seats summary

Government formation
Fine Gael and the Labour Party formed the 14th Government of Ireland, dubbed the National Coalition, with Liam Cosgrave as Taoiseach and Brendan Corish as Tánaiste.

Changes in membership

First-time TDs

Liam Ahern
Joseph Bermingham
Ruairí Brugha
Ray Burke
Johnny Callanan
Seán Calleary
Brendan Daly
John Esmonde
Joseph Farrell
Denis Gallagher
Brendan Griffin
Patrick Hegarty
John Kelly
Jimmy Leonard
Charles McDonald
Ciarán Murphy
Fergus O'Brien
John Ryan
Myles Staunton
Seán Walsh
James White
John Wilson

Outgoing TDs
Frank Aiken (retired)
Terence Boylan (lost seat)
Michael Hilliard (lost seat)
John O'Donovan (lost seat)
Mícheál Ó Móráin (lost seat)

See also
Members of the 13th Seanad

Notes

References

Further reading
 
 

1973 elections in Europe
General election, 1973
1973
20th Dáil
February 1973 events in Europe
General election